Angellot Alexander Caro Garcés (born 3 December 1988) is a Colombian futsal player who plays for Barranquilleros FS.

Career

Caro started his career with Czech side Benago. In 2011, he signed for Caja Segovia in Spain. In 2012, Caro signed for Venezuelan club Trujillanos. In 2013, he signed for Al Wasl in the United Arab Emirates. In 2014, he signed for Colombian team Real Bucaramanga. In 2015, Caro signed for Al Mayadeen in Lebanon, heling them win their only league title.

In 2016, he signed for Kosovan outfit Feniks. In 2018, he signed for Sparta (Praha) in the Czech Republic, helping them win their only league title. In 2019, Caro signed for Iraqi side Naft Al Wasat. In 2019, he signed for Anorthosis in Cyprus. In 2022, he signed for Colombian club Barranquilleros FS.

References

External links

 Angellot Caro at playmakerstats.com 

1988 births
Colombian expatriate sportspeople in the United Arab Emirates
Colombian expatriate sportspeople in Spain
Colombian expatriate sportspeople in the Czech Republic
Colombian expatriate sportspeople in Venezuela
Living people